Petrus Boumal Mayega (born 20 April 1993) is a Cameroonian footballer who plays as a defensive midfielder for Hungarian club Újpest.

Career

Sochaux
Boumal joined Sochaux  in 2006. In 2010, he made his debut for Sochaux's B team against Raon-l'Etape. A year later he was called to the first team and after some matches on the bench he made his Ligue 1 debut in a 0–0 away draw against Dijon on 3 December 2011.

Litex Lovech
Following Sochaux being relegated from the first division, Boumal joined the Bulgarian side Litex Lovech on 2 July 2014.

CSKA Sofia
Boumal signed a contract with CSKA Sofia in September 2016.

Ural Yekaterinburg
On 18 August 2017, Boumal signed with Russian club Ural Yekaterinburg. He left Ural on 3 August 2020.

Nizhny Novgorod
On 7 September 2021, he returned to the Russian Premier League and signed a two-year contract with FC Nizhny Novgorod. His contract was terminated in early December 2021. In his last game for Nizhny Novgorod he was sent off in the first half after receiving two cautions, following the game he had a disagreement with the team manager Aleksandr Kerzhakov.

Újpest
On 15 February 2022, Boumal signed with Újpest in Hungary.

International career
Boumal made his debut for the Cameroon national football team in a 2–2 2018 FIFA World Cup qualification tie with Zambia on 11 November 2017.

Club statistics

Club

References

External links

1993 births
Living people
Footballers from Yaoundé
Cameroonian footballers
Cameroon international footballers
Cameroon under-20 international footballers
Association football midfielders
FC Sochaux-Montbéliard players
PFC Litex Lovech players
PFC CSKA Sofia players
FC Ural Yekaterinburg players
Büyükşehir Belediye Erzurumspor footballers
FC Nizhny Novgorod (2015) players
Újpest FC players
Ligue 1 players
First Professional Football League (Bulgaria) players
Second Professional Football League (Bulgaria) players
Russian Premier League players
Süper Lig players
Cameroonian expatriate footballers
Cameroonian expatriate sportspeople in France
Cameroonian expatriate sportspeople in Bulgaria
Cameroonian expatriate sportspeople in Russia
Cameroonian expatriate sportspeople in Hungary
Expatriate footballers in France
Expatriate footballers in Bulgaria
Expatriate footballers in Russia
Expatriate footballers in Hungary